Vasishtesvarar Temple (வசிஷ்டேஸ்வரர் கோயில்)  is a Hindu temple located at Karunthittaikkudi near Thanjavur in the Thanjavur district of Tamil Nadu, India.

Significance 
Praises of the temple have been sung by the Saivite saints Sambandar and Sundarar of 7th - 8th century CE. The temple is visited by people seeking cures from diseases. The temple is believed to cure problems due to planetary position for people born in the Thiruvadhirai star. The main idol is that of Sundaranayaki who is called "Kadal Partha Nayaki" or the "goddess who saw the seas".

Vaippu Sthalam
It is one of the shrines of the Vaippu Sthalams sung by Tamil Saivite Nayanar Sundarar.

Presiding deity
The presiding deity is known as Vasishtesvarar, Karunasamy and Karuvelanathasamy. His consort is known as Periyanayaki and Tiripurasundari.

Palace Devasthanam
Thanjavur Palace Devasthanam comprises 88 temples, of which this temple is the one. They are maintained and administered by the Hindu Religious and Charitable Endowments Department of the Government of Tamil Nadu.

Karanthai
This place is known as Karanthai, Karunthittaikkudi and Karanthattangudi. There is also another place with  this name Karanthai near Kanchipuram.

References

Gallery 

Shiva temples in Thanjavur district
Hindu temples in Thanjavur district